North 24 Kaatham is a 2013 Indian Malayalam language adventure drama film written and directed by debutant Anil Radhakrishnan Menon. The film features Fahadh Faasil, Nedumudi Venu and Swathi Reddy in the lead roles. The background score is composed by Govind Vasantha. The movie released as an Onam release on 15 September 2013. The movie was well received by critics and won the National Film Award for Best Feature Film in Malayalam. It is widely regarded as one of the defining movies of the Malayalam New Wave.

Plot
Harikrishnan is a geeky software architect who suffers from Obsessive–compulsive personality disorder. His colleagues find it hard to work with him due to his emotional outbursts and odd mannerisms, though the company leadership values him as a core asset to the organization. His colleagues hatch a plan to send him off to Trivandrum to demonstrate on a webinar, one of company's top selling products, which also happens to be developed by Hari. Unfortunately for him, the date of his journey coincides with a harthal day. While going to Trivandrum by train, in the middle of the night, his co-passenger Gopalan, a veteran politician, receives a call informing him that his wife is seriously ill. As soon as the train leaves Kollam, Gopalan, growing concerned about his wife's health decides to change his plan and return to his hometown in Kozhikode to attend to his ailing wife. Seeing the situation, another passenger Narayani a.k.a. Nani, a social worker, decides to join Gopalan. They get down at Paravur railway station. In the confusion to get down at Paravur, Gopalan accidentally drops his cell phone on the train before disembarking. Hari notices the ringing phone when Gopalan's friend Moidheen calls him up to inform about his wife's death. Hari picks the call and hears the sad news. Not knowing how to react in this situation, Hari also gets down at Paravur in the pretext of forgetting his bag on the train. Hari decides to follow Narayani and Gopalan on their return journey to Kozhikode. The plan not only upsets his daily routine and schedule, but also disturbs his standard of hygiene. Nani on the other hand is carefree and unlike Hari, goes out of her way to help others. The journey becomes a learning experience for Hari and how he understands and overcomes various trying situations in life. The film ends with Hari and Nani falling in love and him finally overcoming his OCPD.

Cast

 Fahadh Faasil as Harikrishnan, an IT Professional from Kochi, in a journey to Trivandrum for a webinar.
 Nedumudi Venu as Gopalan, a retired school teacher who is in a journey to Trivandrum for certification issues of his neighbour.
 Swathi Reddy as Narayani, an NGO activist in Trivandrum from Shornur.
 Chemban Vinod Jose as Mustafa, an NRI who is trapped in Kochi at Harthal Day. He needs to move to Chavakkad to see his newly born baby
 Sadiq as Minister
 Mukundan as S I
 Thalaivasal Vijay as Sreekumar, Hari's father
 Jinu Joseph as Office Exicutive, a short tempered on the spot
 Geetha as Maya, Hari's mother
 Sreenath Bhasi as Siddharth a.k.a. Sid, Hari's brother, Red FM RJ
 Premgi Amaren as Vyomkesh, A Tamil guy who married a Kutchi language girl portrayed by Kani Kusruti
 Leona Lishoy as Simi [A new joinee in Harikrishnan's office]
 Srinda Arhaan as Priya, Hari's Colleague
 Disney James as the Railway Guard.
 Nirmal Palazhi
 Prigi Abigail Benger
 Privin Vinish 
 Chinnu Kuruvila as Prathibha
 Pushpa Mathew as Nivedita
 Deepak Nathan as Happy Singh, The Hindi speaking guy in the office who hates Hari

Production
Produced under the banner of E 4 Entertainment, the film sports cinematography by Jayesh Nair and music by Govind Menon (of Thaikkudam Bridge fame).

Kaatham in Malayalam is a unit of distance measurement that amounts to 16 kilometres. The story evolves during a journey; but it's something beyond a travel movie. The film was scheduled to begin filming in May and spanned various scenic locations across Kerala, since it depicts a journey through most of the state. The film's poster caught attention, with its tongue-in-cheek sketch by National Institute of Design graduate Shilpa Alexander depicting a slice of life in Kerala.

Swathi Reddy confirmed that she had signed up for the film. Mumbai-based Prigi Abigail Benger took part in the auditions for North 24 Kaatham and will make her debut opposite Sreenath Bhasi. Tamil comedian Premgi Amaren would be doing a small role in the film and make his Malayalam debut. He shot a few scenes for a couple of days in June. Srinda Ashab was cast to play an IT professional, and Fahadh’s colleague in the film.

Soundtrack

Reception
The film received strongly positive reviews upon release. Sify.com wrote: "North 24 Kaatham is fresh and innovative concept, hilarious at the same time thought provoking and a thoroughly enjoyable ride." Rating the film 3/5, Veeyen of Nowrunning.com said, "'North 24 Kaatham' is an articulation of the randomness of life; of chance and arbitrariness that brings about smiles and rekindles hopes. The emotional pitch that it maintains is mighty, which makes it a highly compassionate film that also marks a brilliant directorial debut." Paresh C Palicha of Rediff.com rated the film 3/5 and concluded his review saying, "North 24 Kaatham is an endearing film and a sure winner for Fahadh Faasil as the leading man and Anil as a debutant director.".

Accolades
 National Film Awards (2013)
 Best Feature Film in Malayalam

 Kerala State Film Awards (2013)
Second Best Film
Best Actor - Fahadh Faasil

 Filmfare Awards South
Filmfare Award for Best Actor - Malayalam - Fahadh Faasil

References

External links
 

2013 films
2010s Malayalam-language films
Indian road movies
Films set in Kerala
Films shot in Kollam
Films scored by Govind Vasantha
Films scored by Rex Vijayan
Best Malayalam Feature Film National Film Award winners
2013 directorial debut films